Region V (Spanish: Región V. Ecatepec) is an intrastate region within the State of Mexico.  It lies to the north of Mexico City in the Valley of Mexico, borders the state of Hidalgo, and the whole region is one of 10 regions in the state which comprise the Metropolitan Area of the Valley of Mexico, but the least populated least dense and farthest municipality is not included  in the definition of Mexico City Metropolitan Area (see Greater Mexico City).  The region comprises five cities, Ecatepec de Morelos,
Otumba, 
Tecámac,
Temascalapa,
and Acolman.

References

Regions of the State of Mexico